Charles Humphries is an English countertenor, noted for performances of Baroque and Renaissance music. He is the director of Baroque music at the SIMF. He has performed at the Barbican Hall, Queen Elizabeth Hall, Wigmore Hall, Concertgebouw in Amsterdam and Palais des Beaux Arts in Brussels and across Europe.

References

External links
Official site

English male singers
Countertenors
Living people
Year of birth missing (living people)